Epidendrum tridactylum  is an epiphytic species of orchid of the genus Epidendrum, occurring in Ecuador, Peru, Bolivia and Brazil.

References 

tridactylum
Epiphytic orchids
Orchids of Bolivia
Orchids of Brazil
Orchids of Ecuador
Orchids of Peru
Plants described in 1838